The Chacorão Dam (or Chocorão Dam) is a proposed dam on the Tapajós river in the state of Pará, Brazil.
It would flood a section of rapids in the river, making them navigable by barges carrying soybeans to ports on the Amazon River. 
The dam would include locks for the barges and a hydroelectric power plant.
It is controversial since it would flood a large area of an indigenous territory.

Location

The proposed Chacorão Dam would be built on the Tapajós river in the state of Pará.
The hydroelectric power plant would be part of the proposed  Tapajós hydroelectric complex on the Tapajos and Jamanxim rivers.
Others are the São Luiz do Tapajós (6,133 MW), Jatobá (2,338 MW), Cachoeira dos Patos (528 MW), Jamanxim (881 MW) and Cachoeira do Cai (802 MW) plants, all under study, as well as the less advanced proposal for the Jardim do Ouro (227 MW).

The São Luiz do Tapajós, Jatobá and Chacorão dams on the Tapajós would together flood , including parts of the Amazônia and Juruena national parks and the Itaituba I and Itaituba II  national forests.
The Chacorão reservoir would affect the Munduruku, Kayabí and Apiacá indigenous people.
It would flood  of the Mundurucu Indigenous Territory.

Technical

Planning process

The dam is part of a plan to convert the Tapajos into a waterway for barges to take soybeans from Mato Grosso to the Amazon River ports.
A continuous chain of dams, with locks, would eliminate today's rapids and waterfalls.
Legal and constitutional objections may be bypassed through "security suspensions."
The Chacorão locks are listed as a priority in the National Waterways Plan (Brazil, MT 2010, p. 22).
The dam's reservoir would eliminate the Chacorão rapids, allowing barge traffic above the dam's locks.
The controversial Chacorão Dam is rarely discussed in the context of the Tapajós Basin developments, despite its central role in the plan.

A "platform" approach is proposed for construction to minimise environmental impact.
There would be no access roads, and workers would be taken to the site by helicopter.
After construction is complete the site would be regenerated.
As of 2010 Eletronorte had not applied for registration with the National Electricity Agency to start feasibility studies for the Chacorão hydroelectric power plant, since it would flood parts of the Mundurucu and  Sai-Cinza indigenous territories.
A spokesman said that without a decree to regulate the constitution there was no way to undertake projects in indigenous territories.

Notes

Sources

Hydroelectric power stations in Brazil
Dams in Pará
Proposed hydroelectric power stations
Proposed renewable energy power stations in Brazil